Walthall County is a county located in the U.S. state of Mississippi. As of the 2020 census, the population was 13,884. Its county seat is Tylertown. The county is named after Civil War Confederate general and Mississippi Senator Edward C. Walthall.

Geography
It is the second-smallest county in Mississippi by area.

Walthall County is located in Southwest Mississippi.

Major highways
  U.S. Highway 98
  Mississippi Highway 27
  Mississippi Highway 44
  Mississippi Highway 48

Adjacent counties
 Lawrence County (north)
 Marion County (east)
 Washington Parish, Louisiana (south)
 Pike County (west)
 Lincoln County (northwest)

Demographics

2020 census

As of the 2020 United States census, there were 13,884 people, 5,601 households, and 3,371 families residing in the county.

2010 census
As of the 2010 United States Census, there were 15,443 people living in the county. 53.4% were White, 44.5% Black or African American, 0.4% Native American, 0.2% Asian, 0.4% of some other race and 1.1% of two or more races. 1.5% were Hispanic or Latino (of any race).

2000 census
As of the census of 2000, there were 15,156 people, 5,571 households, and 4,111 families living in the county.  The population density was 38 people per square mile (14/km2).  There were 6,418 housing units at an average density of 16 per square mile (6/km2).  The racial makeup of the county was 54.61% White, 44.09% Black or African American, 0.12% Native American, 0.24% Asian, 0.01% Pacific Islander, 0.26% from other races, and 0.66% from two or more races.  1.33% of the population were Hispanic or Latino of any race.

There were 5,571 households, out of which 34.00% had children under the age of 18 living with them, 53.00% were married couples living together, 16.90% had a female householder with no husband present, and 26.20% were non-families. 24.00% of all households were made up of individuals, and 11.50% had someone living alone who was 65 years of age or older.  The average household size was 2.69 and the average family size was 3.19.

In the county, the population was spread out, with 28.40% under the age of 18, 9.90% from 18 to 24, 25.40% from 25 to 44, 22.30% from 45 to 64, and 14.10% who were 65 years of age or older.  The median age was 35 years. For every 100 females there were 91.50 males.  For every 100 females age 18 and over, there were 86.20 males.

The median income for a household in the county was $22,945, and the median income for a family was $29,169. Males had a median income of $26,745 versus $16,909 for females. The per capita income for the county was $12,563.  About 22.40% of families and 27.80% of the population were below the poverty line, including 42.70% of those under age 18 and 17.50% of those age 65 or over.

Communities

Town
 Tylertown (county seat)

Unincorporated communities
 Darbun
 Dexter
 Little Improve
 Mesa
 Salem
 Sartinville
 Union
 Hope
 Dillon
 Kirklin

Politics

See also
 National Register of Historic Places listings in Walthall County, Mississippi

References

 
Mississippi counties
1910 establishments in Mississippi
Populated places established in 1910